The Berne Union, also known as The International Union of Credit & Investment Insurers, is an international non-profit association and community for the global export credit and investment insurance industry.

The association provides a forum for professional exchange among members, as well as promoting constructive engagement in collaborative projects with external stakeholders from across the wider trade finance industry, including banks and financiers, regulators and policy setters, traders, academics and other associations. Its mission is to actively facilitate cross-border trade by supporting international acceptance of sound principles in export credit and foreign investment.

Membership 
As of January 2023, the Berne Union represents 86 member companies from 67 countries worldwide.  These include government-backed official export credit agencies, private credit and political risk insurers and multilateral institutions. In 2021, Berne Union members collectively provided payment risk protection to banks, exporters and investors amounting to US$2.7 trillion. This total business volume represents cover of approximately 13% of total world cross border trade for goods and services, as recorded by WTO figures.

History 
The Berne union was founded in 1934 by private and state export credit insurers from France, Italy, Spain and the UK. The first meeting was held in Berne, Switzerland – which is where the name Berne Union comes from. While Berne is still the legal domicile of the Union, it has not met there since 1939.

Notable milestones include:
 An expanded mandate in 1974, to include members who insure foreign investments
 Creation of the 'Prague Club in 1993, designed to support new and maturing export credit agencies and insurers setting up and developing export credit and investment insurance schemes
 In 1999, the export credit members formed two committees, focusing on short term and medium/long term export credit business 
As of 2017, the modern Berne Union is structured around four committees, representing these two export credit groups (short term and medium/long term) along with an investment insurance committee and the so-called Prague Club' Committee (PC), which was formally integrated in May 2016, having been a legally separate, but closely associated entity prior to this.

Governance 
The Berne Union is led by the President, Vice President and a Management Committee, with each elected position held for a term of two years. The Management Committee are supported by a permanent Secretariat, led by the Secretary General and based in London, in the United Kingdom.

The Current President is Ms Maëlia Dufour, Director of International Relations, Business Development, Rating, Environment and Climate BPIFRANCE - France's Export Credit Agency. Current Vice President, Mr Benjamin Mugisha, Chief Underwriting Officer of Multilateral Insurer African Trade Insurance. Both were elected in November 2022, for a term of two years.

Mr Vinco David was appointed Secretary General of the Berne Union in November 2016, with effect from March 2017.

Activities 
Members of the Berne Union meet twice per year for the Spring General Meeting (in April/May) and the Annual General Meeting (in October / November). Throughout the year a further 5-6 meetings take place on specialist topics such as: claims and recoveries, country risk, project finance, reinsurance, data reporting etc.

Current Berne Union Members

References

External links
 Berne Union website
 The Berne Union: An Overview Congressional Research Service

Insurance industry organizations
Organisations based in Bern
Trade associations based in Switzerland